The Professional School of Psychology (PSP) is a graduate school of clinical and organizational psychology headquartered in Sacramento, California, USA.  It has its roots in Huckleberry House, San Francisco, 1979. 

Approved by the State of California to grant master's and doctorate degrees in psychology, PSP specializes in clinical and organizational psychology. California state approval has been granted under California Education Code 94310.2. The program also is designed to fulfill the requirements of California Business and Professions Code, Section 4980.40 (a) though (d), and 4980.41 (a) through (d). However, applicants should be aware that units earned for courses taken at PSP may not be acceptable for transfer credit at other graduate schools.

PSP is moving to a distributed learning model.

Notable faculty and graduates of PSP include:

Twylla R W Abrahamson

William H Bergquist, president

John Preston (clinical psychopharmacology) 

Marcia Schiller

The school is located at 3550 Watt Avenue, Suite 140 Sacramento, CA 95821 USA

References

Education in California